An election was held on November 8, 2022, to elect all 40 members to Massachusetts' Senate. The election coincided with elections for other offices, including governor, and U.S. House of Representatives. The Massachusetts Democratic Party retained a supermajority in the chamber.

Predictions

Overview

Election

Closest races 
Seats where the margin of victory was under 10%:

Summary of Results by Senate District 
Bold text denotes a gain for a party.

See also 
 2020 Massachusetts general election
 2020 Massachusetts House of Representatives election
 2019–2020 Massachusetts legislature
 2021–2022 Massachusetts legislature

References

External links 
 State Legislature
 Election at Ballotpedia
 
 
  (State affiliate of the U.S. League of Women Voters)

Senate 2022
Massachusetts Senate